"Lift Me Up" is a song by American electronica musician Moby. It was released as the first single from his seventh studio album, Hotel (2005), on February 28, 2005. It achieved success in many countries, including Italy, the United Kingdom, France, Belgium, Denmark, Finland, and Spain, where it was a top ten hit.

Background
Moby claims to have written the song in 2004 after the re-election of President George W. Bush, adding that it reflected his consideration to emigrate to Canada in protest. Moby has stated that the theme of the song is about the rise of global intolerance and fundamentalism. The word "Ama" in the chorus ("lift me up, higher now, Ama"), that was often misheard and vastly misinterpreted, was meant to sound like a name of an unspecific deity. According to Moby, it was based on the "ah" sound that commonly appears in the names of God in many languages.

This song originally was to be sung with The Sisters of Mercy's singer Andrew Eldritch and is partly inspired by that band's material.

Use in media
In 2005, the song was used as an outro for Australia's Nine's Wide World of Sports coverage; in Italy, in a commercial for Vodafone; and on ITV Sport, for the theme of their Formula One coverage from 2006 to 2008. This was remixed with a variety of sounds to give it a faster pace. The song was featured in the racing game Asphalt: Urban GT 2 for N-Gage and Nintendo DS, and was used in the Beatmania series of rhythm games. The track was also the theme for Discovery Quest's Expedition Borneo on the Discovery Channel in February 2007. As well, the song was featured in the thirteenth episode of the third season of Doctor Who.

Track listings

 CD single 
 "Lift Me Up"  – 3:08
 "Mulholland" – 8:31
 CD single 
 "Lift Me Up"  – 6:44
 "Lift Me Up"  – 6:51
 "Lift Me Up"  – 7:10
 "Lift Me Up"  – 3:22
 "Lift Me Up"  – 3:11
Contains bonus Digimpro remix software
 12-inch single 
 "Lift Me Up"  – 6:44
 "Lift Me Up"  – 6:51
 "Lift Me Up"  – 7:10

 Digital single
 "Lift Me Up"  – 3:08
 "Mulholland" – 8:31
 "Lift Me Up"  – 6:44
 "Lift Me Up"  – 6:51
 "Lift Me Up"  – 7:10
 "Lift Me Up" – 3:17

Personnel
 Moby – vocals, instrumentation, writing, engineering, production
 Brian Sperber – engineering, mixing
 Scott Frassetto – drums
 Brian Sperber – backing vocals
 Jason Candler – backing vocals
 Kurt Uenala – backing vocals
 Orion Simprini – backing vocals
 Shayna Steele – backing vocals
 Graphic Therapy and NYC – artwork
 Danny Clinch – photography

Charts

Weekly charts

Year-end charts

Certifications

References

External links
 
 

2005 singles
2005 songs
Moby songs
Mute Records singles
Songs written by Moby